The 1993 Yonex All England Open was the 83rd edition of the All England Open Badminton Championships. It was held from March 17 to March 21, 1993, in London, England.

It was a five-star tournament and the prize money was US$125,000.

Venue
Wembley Arena

Final results

Men's singles

Section 1

Section 2

Women's singles

Section 1

Section 2

References

External links
Smash: 1993 All England Open

All England Open Badminton Championships
All England Open
All England
All England Open Badminton Championships in London
All England Open Badminton Championships
All England Open Badminton Championships